Todd Shafer (born November 29, 1976) is an American professional stock car racing driver. He last competed part-time in the NASCAR Camping World Truck Series, driving the Nos. 07 and 08 Chevrolet Silverados for SS-Green Light Racing.

Motorsports career results

NASCAR
(key) (Bold – Pole position awarded by qualifying time. Italics – Pole position earned by points standings or practice time. * – Most laps led.)

Busch Series

Camping World Truck Series

ARCA Re/Max Series
(key) (Bold – Pole position awarded by qualifying time. Italics – Pole position earned by points standings or practice time. * – Most laps led.)

References

External links
 

1976 births
NASCAR drivers
Living people
People from Ashland, Ohio
Racing drivers from Ohio
ARCA Menards Series drivers